St Olaves is a village in the English county of Norfolk. It is within The Broads national park.

Today the village forms part of the civil parish of Fritton and St Olaves, which in turn is within the district of Great Yarmouth in Norfolk. Prior to local government reorganisation in 1974 however, the village was part of the parish of Herringfleet in the Lothingland Rural District of Suffolk.

St Olaves Bridge, a suspension bridge, is the first bridging point on the Waveney above Great Yarmouth. St Olaves used to have its own railway station, which closed in 1959.

The village is the location of  the remains of a 13th-century Augustinian priory. St. Olaves Priory was dedicated to St Olav. On the site there are parts of the refectory, cloisters, and the priory mill.

References

External links

Villages in Norfolk
Borough of Great Yarmouth